The Australian state of Tasmania has several newspapers, magazines and television stations local to the island, and has historically had a strong mass media production environment.

Magazines
Tasmania 40° South
Island Magazine
The Hobart Magazine

Newspapers
Tasmania has three major newspapers

The Advocate - North-West Tasmania
The Examiner - Launceston & surrounds
The Mercury - Hobart & surrounds

In addition, a number of regional newspapers are published in Tasmania. Font Publishing produces five papers in the South-East, Derwent Valley and King Island, Corporate Communications produces three papers in Hobart and surrounds, and Yeates Media produces three papers in Kingston, Huonville and Circular Head.

Television
Tasmania has five broadcast television stations:

 ABC Television Tasmania (ABT)
 SBS Television Tasmania (SBS)
 Seven Tasmania (TNT) - Seven Network affiliate
 WIN Television Tasmania (TVT) - Nine Network affiliate
 Tasmanian Digital Television (TDT) -  Network 10 affiliate

Radio

Tasmania has a wide range of radio stations.  Hobart and Launceston both have a range of local, which collectively broadcast coverage to most of the island. Tasmania's first radio station was 7ZL was founded in the Mercury Building, Hobart in 1927, while Launceston's first station, 7LA, began to broadcast in 1930. 7ZL became part of the Australian Broadcasting Corporation upon its establishment. In 1930, 7HOFM began to broadcast, as Hobart's first commercial radio station. Today, all of Tasmania's commercial radio stations are owned by either Grant Broadcasters or Southern Cross Austereo.

Major radio stations in Tasmania include

Southern Tasmania
 ABC Radio Hobart (936 kHZ)
 Ultra106five (106.5 MHz)
 Triple M Hobart (107.3 MHz)
 Hit 100.9 (100.9 MHz)
 7HOFM (101.7 MHz)

Northern Tasmania
 Sea FM (101.7 FM)
 89.3 LAFM (89.3 MHz) & 90.1 Chilli FM (90.1MHz)
 ABC Northern Tasmania (91.7 MHz)

References

Mass media in Tasmania